Ignaz Schustala (7 December 182229 January 1891) was a Czech

References

External links

 Birth and baptism record (Czech)

1822 births
1891 deaths
People from Kopřivnice
19th-century Czech businesspeople
European founders of automobile manufacturers
19th-century Austrian businesspeople